The 776th Radar Squadron is an inactive United States Air Force unit. It was last assigned to the Northeast Air Defense Sector, Air Combat Command, stationed at Bangor Air National Guard Base, Maine, where it was inactivated on 6 September 1991.

From 1951-1980, the unit was a General Surveillance Radar squadron providing for the air defense of North America.  From 1985-1991, it operated Over The Horizion Backscatter(OTH-B) radar for Tactical Air Command.

Lineage
 Constituted as the 776th Aircraft Control and Warning Squadron on 14 November 1950
 Activated on 27 November 1950
 Redesignated 776th Radar Squadron (SAGE), 15 January 1961
 Redesignated 776th Radar Squadron on 1 February 1974
 Inactivated on 30 September 1980
 Activated 1 October 1985
 Inactivated 6 September 1991

Assignments
 542d Aircraft Control and Warning Group, 27 November 1950
 28th Air Division, 6 February 1952
 San Francisco Air Defense Sector, 1 July 1960
 Portland Air Defense Sector, 1 August 1963
 26th Air Division, 1 April 1966
 27th Air Division, 15 September 1969
 26th Air Division, 19 November 1969 - 30 September 1980
 24th Air Division 1 October 1985
 Northeast Air Defense Sector, 1 December 1987 - 6 September 1991

Stations
 Point Arena Air Force Station, California, 1 January 1951 – 30 September 1980
 Bangor Air National Guard Base, Maine, 1 October 1985 – 6 September 1991 (HQ Site)
 Moscow Air Force Station, Maine (OTH-B Transmitter site)
 Columbia Falls Air Force Station, Maine (OTH-B Receiver site)

See also
 Over-the-horizon radar
 List of United States Air Force aircraft control and warning squadrons

References

Notes
 Explanatory notes

 Citations

Bibliography

 
 
 
 Moscow Air Force Station 

 Further reading
 

Radar squadrons of the United States Air Force
Aerospace Defense Command units
1951 establishments in California
1991 disestablishments in Maine